Isakovo is a rural locality (a village) in Mishutinskoye Rural Settlement, Vozhegodsky District, Vologda Oblast, Russia. The population was 18 as of 2002.

Geography 
Isakovo is located 64 km east of Vozhega (the district's administrative centre) by road. Fatyanovo is the nearest rural locality.

References 

Rural localities in Vozhegodsky District